A list of animated television series first aired in 2003.

See also
 List of animated feature films of 2003
 List of Japanese animation television series of 2003

References

Television series
Animated series
2003
2003
2003-related lists